The Almost Good Man is a 1917 American silent Western film directed by Fred Kelsey, released by Universal Pictures and starring Harry Carey.

Cast
 Harry Carey
 Claire Du Brey
 Albert MacQuarrie
 Frank MacQuarrie
 Vester Pegg

See also
 List of American films of 1917
 Harry Carey filmography

References

External links
 

1917 films
1917 Western (genre) films
1917 short films
American silent short films
American black-and-white films
Films directed by Fred Kelsey
Silent American Western (genre) films
1910s American films
1910s English-language films